The livery companies and guilds of the City of London are listed below.

Livery companies

Companies without liveries

Guilds and companies awaiting livery

 Company of Public Relations Practitioners
 Guild of Entrepreneurs - Motto: "Dare, Create, Succeed"
 Guild of Human Resources Professionals
 Guild of Nurses

References

Notes

Livery Companies